Sanasomboun District  is a district (muang) of Champasak province in southwestern Laos.

Towns and villages

References

Districts of Champasak province